Moyo, is the main municipal, administrative, and commercial center of Moyo District in the Northern Region of Uganda. The district headquarters are located here.

Location

The coordinates of Moyo Town are 3°39'18.0"N, 31°43'12.0"E (Latitude:3.654989; Longitude:31.720006).

Population
In 2015, Uganda Bureau of Statistics (UBOS) estimated the population of the town at 10,700. In 2020, the population agency estimated the mid-year population of the town at 12,100 people. Of these, 6,300 (52.1 percent) were female and 5,800 (47.9 percent) were male. UBOS calculated the population growth rate of Moyo Town to average 2.49 percent annually, between 2015 and 2020.

Points of interest
The following points of interest are located in Moyo Town or close to the town limits:

1. The headquarters of Moyo District Administration

2. The offices of Moyo Town Council 

3. Moyo Airport, a civilian airport administered by the Civil Aviation Authority of Uganda.

4. Moyo Central Market

5. Koboko–Yumbe–Moyo Road makes a T-junction with the Atiak–Adjumani–Moyo–Afoji Road in the middle of town.

6. Moyo General Hospital, a 176-bed public hospital administered by the Uganda Ministry of Health

7. Moyo Campus of Uganda Martyrs University.

See also
 List of airports in Uganda
 List of cities and towns in Uganda

References

External links
 Profile of Moyo District

Populated places in Northern Region, Uganda
Cities in the Great Rift Valley
Moyo District
West Nile sub-region